The officer commanding (OC), also known as the officer in command or officer in charge (OiC), is the commander of a sub-unit or minor unit (smaller than battalion size), principally used in the United Kingdom and Commonwealth. In other countries, the term commanding officer is applied to commanders of minor as well as major units.

Normally an officer commanding is a company, squadron or battery commander (typically a major, although formerly a captain in infantry and cavalry units). However, the commanders of independent units of smaller than company size, detachments and administrative organisations, such as schools or wings, may also be designated officers commanding.

The term "officer commanding" is not applied to every officer who is given command of a minor unit. For example, a platoon commander whose platoon is part of a company would not be an officer commanding. The officer commanding with power over that platoon would be the company OC. "Officer commanding" is an appointment that confers a level of additional powers and responsibilities on the appointee.

Officers commanding are generally given the same power and responsibilities as commanding officers of battalions and regiments. They are held responsible for the unit's properties and monies, can hear disciplinary charges against soldiers, sailors, or airmen under their command, and can delegate these powers.

Titles
Command and control